Aristide Amouzoud (born 22 April 1969) is a Congolese footballer. He played in two matches for the Congo national football team in 1992. He was also named in Congo's squad for the 1992 African Cup of Nations tournament.

References

1969 births
Living people
Republic of the Congo footballers
Republic of the Congo international footballers
1992 African Cup of Nations players
Place of birth missing (living people)
Association football forwards
Étoile du Congo players
K.A.S. Eupen players
Republic of the Congo expatriate footballers
Expatriate footballers in Belgium